Aleksandr Gennadyevich Studzinsky (born 21 June 1976) is a former Russian professional footballer.

Club career
He made his debut in the Russian Premier League in 2001 for FC Torpedo-ZIL Moscow.

External links
 

1976 births
People from Horlivka
Living people
Russian footballers
Association football midfielders
FC Dynamo Stavropol players
FC Moscow players
FC Kristall Smolensk players
FC Volgar Astrakhan players
FC Tom Tomsk players
FC Kuban Krasnodar players
FC Sodovik Sterlitamak players
FC Fakel Voronezh players
FC Nistru Otaci players
FC Zhemchuzhina Sochi players
Russian Premier League players
Moldovan Super Liga players
Russian expatriate footballers
Expatriate footballers in Moldova
Russian expatriate sportspeople in Moldova
FC Spartak-MZhK Ryazan players